Avera is an associated commune on the island of Raiatea, in French Polynesia. It is the larger of two villages in French Polynesia with this name, the other being located on the island of Rurutu. It is part of the commune Taputapuatea. According to the 2017 census, it had grown to a population 3,265 people.

References

Raiatea
Populated places in the Society Islands